Yüksel or Yuksel is a Turkish given name and surname meaning "rise!", imperative of "yükselmek" ("to rise"). Notable people with the name include:

Given name
 Yüksel Alkan, Turkish basketball player
Yüksel Ayaydın, Turkish kickboxer
Yüksel Coşkunyürek, Turkish politician
Yüksel Koptagel (born 1931), Turkish composer and pianist
Yüksel Pazarkaya (born 1940), Turkish writer, translator and broadcaster
Yüksel Sariyar (born 1979), Austrian footballer
Yüksel Yavuz (born 1964), Turkish-born German Kurdish film director 
Yüksel Yesilova, Turkish football player and coach
Yüksel Yılmaz, Turkish martial artist and writer
Yuksel Yumerov, Bulgarian footballer
Yüksel Şanlı, Turkish Olympic wrestler

Surname
 Atakan Yüksel (born 1985), Turkish wrestler
 Edip Yüksel (born 1957), Turkish American moderate religious reformer
 Gülistan Yüksel (born 1962), German politician
 Levent Yüksel (born 1964), Turkish singer-songwriter
 Metin Yüksel (1958–1979), Turkish Islamist
 Müjde Yüksel (born 1981), Turkish female basketball player

See also
 Yüksel, Dinar, village in Afyonkarahisar Province, Turkey
Yüksel Tohumculuk, a Turkish plant breeding company based in Antalya

Turkish-language surnames
Turkish masculine given names